Kristján Kristjánsson also known as KK is an Icelandic blues and folk musician.

Early life and career
KK was born on March 26, 1956 in Minnesota, United States, to Icelandic parents but moved to Iceland with his family around the age of 10. He attended music school in Malmö, Sweden for four years and then played his way across Europe from 1985 until 1990, when he returned to Iceland. He has been nominated for the Gríma Prize twice and has been awarded the Icelandic Music Prize twice.

In 2007 he toured to Shanghai with Magnús Eiríksson ("Maggi") and Óttar Felix Hauksson in advance of the release of their next recording there and in Iceland. In 2010 he played with his band at the World Expo in Shanghai, representing Iceland.

KK appeared as supporting character "Gunnar", an Icelandic musician that is the father of Tuppence Middleton's character, Riley Blue/Gunnarsdóttir, on the Netflix series Sense8.

Personal life
The singer Ellen Kristjánsdóttir is KK's sister. He composed "When I Think of Angels" and he and Ellen perform it in memory of another sister who died in a car crash in 1992. A video of them performing the song produced by the Icelandic Red Cross is used for Red Cross fundraising.

Traditionally, KK and Ellen perform Christmas music every year in Reykjavík.

Discography

Singles
Solo
2012: "Frelsið" (ICE #1)
as KK & Magnús Eiríksson
2013: "Á sjó" (ICE #9)

Albums

Solo
1991: "Lucky One" (KK)
1995: "Gleðifólkið" (KK)
1997: "Heimaland" (KK)
2001: "Galfjaðrir" (KK)
2002: "Paradís" (KK)
2004: "Upphafið" (KK)
2006: "Blús" (12 Tonar)
2008: "Svona eru menn" (JPV)

KK Band
1992: "Bein leið"
1993: "Hotel Föroyar"

KK and Magnus
(at times, credited as KK og Magnus Eiríksson)
1996: "Ómissandi fólk"
1999: "Kóngur einn dag" (Japis)
2000: "Lifað og leikið" (Zonet)
2003: "22 Ferðalög" (Zonet)
2005: "Fleiri ferðalög" (Zonet)
2007: "Langferðalög" (Zonet)
2011: "Þrefaldur" (Zonet 044) (three-disc set including Ómissandi fólk, Kóngur einn dag, and Lifað og leikið.)
2013: "Úti á sjó"

KK and Ellen
2005: "Jólin eru að koma"
2011: "Jólin"

References

Sources
 Einar Kárason. KK: þangað sem vindurinn blæs. Reykjavík: Almenna bókafélagið, 2002.  (biography)

External links
 

1956 births
American emigrants to Iceland
Icelandic musicians
Living people